Château-Thierry is a French commune situated in the department of the Aisne, in the administrative region of Hauts-de-France, and in the historic Province of Champagne.

The origin of the name of the town is unknown. The local tradition attributes it to Theuderic IV, the penultimate Merovingian king, who was imprisoned  by Charles Martel, without a reliable source. Château-Thierry is the birthplace of Jean de La Fontaine and was the location of the First Battle of the Marne and Second Battle of the Marne. The region of Château-Thierry (the arrondissement, to be exact) is called the country of Omois. Château-Thierry is one of 64 French towns to have received the Legion of Honour.

History

In the late years of the western Roman empire, a small town called Otmus was settled on a site where the Soissons-Troyes road crossed the Marne river. During the 8th century, Charles Martel kept king Theuderic IV prisoner in the castle of Otmus. At this time, the town took the name of Castrum Theodorici, later transformed in Château-Thierry (Castle of Thierry, Thierry is the French or early Roman language translation of Theuderic).

In 946, the castle of Château-Thierry was the home of Herbert le-Vieux, Count of Omois of the House of Vermandois and Soissons.

Château-Thierry was the site of two important battles: the Battle of Château-Thierry (1814) in the Napoleonic Wars between France and Prussia, and the Battle of Château-Thierry (1918) in World War I between the United States and Germany.

In 1918, a mounting for the Paris Gun was found near the castle, though the cannon itself had apparently been moved prior to the emplacement's discovery.

Geography

Transport
Château-Thierry station is the terminus station of a regional railway line starting from the Gare de l'Est in Paris. Furthermore, it has rail connections to Châlons-en-Champagne, Nancy and Strasbourg. It is also one of the exits of the A4 autoroute that links Paris with the east part of France. Transval operates the local bus routes.

Personalities 
Château-Thierry was the birthplace of:
 Walter of Château-Thierry (died 1249) a French theologian and scholastic philosopher.
 Samuel ben Solomon of Falaise 13th-century rabbi (one of the proponents of the Talmud during the Disputation of Paris).
 Jean de La Fontaine (1621–1695), a fabulist and poet, known best for his Fables.
 Jean-Baptiste Dumangin (1744–1826), French physician who performed the autopsy of Louis XVII.
  (1774–1818), army general of the French First Republic and the First French Empire.
 Chevalier de Saint-Georges (1745–1799), a French Creole virtuoso violinist and composer
  (1762-1829), army general of the French First Republic and the First French Empire, born in Lyon and died in Château-Thierry.
  (1777-1825), cavalry colonel of the armies of the French First Republic and the First French Empire.
 Jean Macé (1815–1894), an educator, journalist, active freemason and politician.
 Maurice Holleaux (1861–1932), 19th– to 20th-century French historian, archaeologist and epigrapher.
  (1870-1965), parasitologist and medical historian, was born in the city.
  (1874-1958), sculptor.
 François Aman-Jean (1894–1986) physician, surgeon, writer and playwright
 Teddy Roosevelt's son Quentin (1897–1918) was shot down  while flying a French SPAD plane during WWI.
  (1881-1953), glassworker.
 Ba Jin (1904–2005), a Chinese writer and intellectual, stayed here in 1927 and 1928.
 Auguste Jordan (1909-1990), Austrian professional footballer who played on the French national team.
 Léon Hess, creator of the "Le Castel" gâteau du voyageur, who won a gold medal at the 1912 Exposition Culinaire Internationale in Paris.
 Nadia Tagrine (1917-2003), pianist.
 Manu Dibango (1933–2020) a Cameroonian musician and songwriter
 Yves Bot (1947–2019), magistrate.
 Pierre Bensusan (born 1957) a French-Algerian acoustic guitarist.
 The novel The Greengage Summer (1958) of Rumer Godden (1907–1998) is set in Château-Thierry.
 and 
 , actor and stuntman, died in Château-Thierry.
 .
 .
 .
 .

Population

Sights
 Castle walls
 Saint-Crépin church (15th century)
 Balhan tower
 Marne River
 World War I Aisne-Marne American Cemetery and Memorial (south of the village of Belleau)
 Chateau-Thierry American Monument (overlooking the town)
 Champagne vineyards
 Several churches

Twin towns – sister cities

Château-Thierry is twinned with:
 Cisnădie, Romania (1997)
 Grybów (rural gmina), Poland
 Mosbach, Germany (1974)
 Pößneck, Germany (1989)

See also
 Château de Condé
 Communes of the Aisne department
 US I Corps

References

External links

 Official site 
 American Battlefield Monument Commission
 FirstWorldWar.com
 Local Bus Route
 Photo of city during WWI

Communes of Aisne
Subprefectures in France
Champagne (province)
Aisne communes articles needing translation from French Wikipedia